Most water in Earth's atmosphere and on its crust comes from saline seawater, while fresh water accounts for nearly 1% of the total. The vast bulk of the water on Earth is saline or salt water, with an average salinity of 35‰ (or 3.5%, roughly equivalent to 34 grams of salts in 1 kg of seawater), though this varies slightly according to the amount of runoff received from surrounding land. In all, water from oceans and marginal seas, saline groundwater and water from saline closed lakes amount to over 97% of the water on Earth, though no closed lake stores a globally significant amount of water. Saline groundwater is seldom considered except when evaluating water quality in arid regions. 

The remainder of Earth's water constitutes the planet's fresh water resource. Typically, fresh water is defined as water with a salinity of less than 1 percent that of the oceans - i.e. below around 0.35‰. Water with a salinity between this level and 1‰ is typically referred to as marginal water because it is marginal for many uses by humans and animals. The ratio of salt water to fresh water on Earth is around 50 to 1.

The planet's fresh water is also very unevenly distributed. Although in warm periods such as the Mesozoic and Paleogene when there were no glaciers anywhere on the planet all fresh water was found in rivers and streams, today most fresh water exists in the form of ice, snow, groundwater and soil moisture, with only 0.3% in liquid form on the surface. Of the liquid surface fresh water, 87% is contained in lakes, 11% in swamps, and only 2% in rivers. Small quantities of water also exist in the atmosphere and in living beings.

Although the total volume of groundwater is known to be much greater than that of river runoff, a large proportion of this groundwater is saline and should therefore be classified with the saline water above. There is also a lot of fossil groundwater in arid regions that has never been renewed for thousands of years; this must not be seen as renewable water.

Distribution of saline and fresh water 
The total volume of water on Earth is estimated at 1.386 billion km³ (333 million cubic miles), with 97.5% being salt water and 2.5% being fresh water. Of the fresh water, only 0.3% is in liquid form on the surface.

Because the oceans that cover roughly 63% of the area of Earth reflect blue light, Earth appears blue from space, and is often referred to as the blue planet and the Pale Blue Dot. Liquid freshwater like lakes and rivers cover about 1% of Earth's surface and altogether with Earth's ice cover, Earth's surface is 75% water by area.

Lakes 
Collectively, Earth's lakes hold 199,000 km3 of water. Most lakes are in the high northern latitudes, far from human population centers. The North American Great Lakes, which contain 21% of the world's fresh water by volume, are an exception. The Great Lakes Basin is home to 33 million people. The Canadian cities of Thunder Bay, St. Catharines, Hamilton, Toronto, Oshawa, and Kingston, as well as the U.S. cities of Detroit, Duluth, Milwaukee, Chicago, Gary, Cleveland, Buffalo, and Rochester are all located on shores of the Great Lakes System.

Groundwater 
Fresh groundwater is of great value, especially in arid countries such as China. Its distribution is broadly similar to that of surface river water, but it is easier to store in hot and dry climates because groundwater storage are much more shielded from evaporation than are dams. In countries such as Yemen, groundwater from erratic rainfall during the rainy season is the major source of irrigation water.

Because groundwater recharge is much more difficult to accurately measure than surface runoff, groundwater is not generally used in areas where even fairly limited levels of surface water are available. Even today, estimates of total groundwater recharge vary greatly for the same region depending on what source is used, and cases where fossil groundwater is exploited beyond the recharge rate (including the Ogallala Aquifer) are very frequent and almost always not seriously considered when they were first developed.

Distribution of river water
The total volume of water in rivers is estimated at 2,120 km³ (510 cubic miles), or 0.49% of the surface fresh water on Earth. Rivers and basins are often compared not according to their static volume, but to their flow of water, or surface run off. The distribution of river runoff across the Earth's surface is very uneven.

There can be huge variations within these regions. For example, as much as a quarter of Australia's limited renewable fresh water supply is found in almost uninhabited Cape York Peninsula. Also, even in well-watered continents, there are areas that are extremely short of water, such as Texas in North America, whose renewable water supply totals only 26 km³/year in an area of 695,622 km2, or South Africa, with only 44 km³/year in 1,221,037 km2. The areas of greatest concentration of renewable water are:

 The Amazon and Orinoco Basins (a total of 6,500 km³/year or 15 percent of global runoff)
 East Asia
 Yangtze Basin - 1,000 km³/year
 South and Southeast Asia, with a total of 8,000 km³/year or 18 percent of global runoff
 Ganges Basin - 900 km³/year
 Irrawaddy Basin - 500 km³/year
 Mekong Basin - 450 km³/year
 Canada, with over 10 percent of world's river water and large numbers in lakes
 Mackenzie River - over 250 km³/year
 Yukon River - over 150 km³/year
 Siberia
 Yenisey - over 5% of world's fresh water in basin - second largest after the Amazon
 Ob River - over 500 km³/year
 Lena River - over 450 km³/year
 New Guinea
 Fly and Sepik Rivers - total over 300 km³/year in only about 150,000 km2 of basin area.

Area, volume, and depth of oceans 

The oceanic crust is young, thin and dense, with none of the rocks within it dating from any older than the breakup of Pangaea. Because water is much denser than any gas, this means that water will flow into the "depressions" formed as a result of the high density of oceanic crust (on a planet like Venus, with no water, the depressions appear to form a vast plain above which rise plateaux). Since the low density rocks of the continental crust contain large quantities of easily eroded salts of the alkali and alkaline earth metals, salt has, over billions of years, accumulated in the oceans as a result of evaporation returning the fresh water to land as rain and snow.

Variability of water availability 

Variability of water availability is important both for the functioning of aquatic species and also for the availability of water for human use: water that is only available in a few wet years must not be considered renewable. Because most global runoff comes from areas of very low climatic variability, the total global runoff is generally of low variability.

Indeed, even in most arid zones, there tends to be few problems with variability of runoff because most usable sources of water come from high mountain regions which provide highly reliable glacier melt as the chief source of water, which also comes in the summer peak period of high demand for water. This historically aided the development of many of the great civilizations of ancient history, and even today allows for agriculture in such productive areas as the San Joaquin Valley.

However, in Australia and Southern Africa, the story is different. Here, runoff variability is much higher than in other continental regions of the world with similar climates. Typically temperate (Köppen climate classification C) and arid (Köppen climate classification B) climate rivers in Australia and Southern Africa have as much as three times the coefficient of variation of runoff of those in other continental regions. The reason for this is that, whereas all other continents have had their soils largely shaped by Quaternary glaciation and mountain building, soils of Australia and Southern Africa have been largely unaltered since at least the early Cretaceous and generally since the previous ice age in the Carboniferous. Consequently, available nutrient levels in Australian and Southern African soils tend to be orders of magnitude lower than those of similar climates in other continents, and native flora compensate for this through much higher rooting densities (e.g. proteoid roots) to absorb minimal phosphorus and other nutrients. Because these roots absorb so much water, runoff in typical Australian and Southern African rivers does not occur until about 300 mm (12 inches) or more of rainfall has occurred. In other continents, runoff will occur after quite light rainfall due to the low rooting densities.

The consequence of this is that many rivers in Australia and Southern Africa (as compared to extremely few in other continents) are theoretically impossible to regulate because rates of evaporation from dams mean a storage sufficiently large to theoretically regulate the river to a given level would actually allow very little draft to be used. Examples of such rivers include those in the Lake Eyre Basin. Even for other Australian rivers, a storage three times as large is needed to provide a third the supply of a comparable climate in southeastern North America or southern China. It also affects aquatic life, favouring strongly those species able to reproduce rapidly after high floods so that some will survive the next drought.

Tropical (Köppen climate classification A) climate rivers in Australia and Southern Africa do not, in contrast, have markedly lower runoff ratios than those of similar climates in other regions of the world. Although soils in tropical Australia and southern Africa are even poorer than those of the arid and temperate parts of these continents, vegetation can use organic phosphorus or phosphate dissolved in rainwater as a source of the nutrient. In cooler and drier climates these two related sources tend to be virtually useless, which is why such specialized means are needed to extract the most minimal phosphorus.

There are other isolated areas of high runoff variability, though these are basically due to erratic rainfall rather than different hydrology. These include:
 Southwest Asia
 The Brazilian Nordeste
 The Great Plains of the United States

Possible water reservoirs inside Earth 

It has been hypothesized that the water is present in the Earth's crust, mantle and even the core and interacts with the surface ocean through the "whole-Earth water cycle". However, the actual amount of water stored in the Earth's interior still remains under debate. An estimated 1.5 to 11 times the amount of water in the oceans may be found hundreds of kilometers deep within the Earth's interior, although not in liquid form.

Water in Earth's mantle 

The lower mantle of inner earth may hold as much as 5 times more water than all surface water combined (all oceans, all lakes, all rivers).

The amount of water stored in the Earth's interior may equal or exceed that in all of the surface oceans. Some researchers proposed the total mantle water budget may amount to tens of ocean masses. The water in the Earth's mantle is primarily dissolved in nominally anhydrous minerals as hydroxyls (OH). These OH impurities in rocks and minerals can lubricates tectonic plate, influence rock viscosity and melting processes, and slow down seismic waves. The two mantle phases at the transition zone between Earth's upper and lower mantle, wadsleyite and ringwoodite, could potentially incorporate up to a few weight percent of water into their crystal structure. Direct evidence of the presence of water in the Earth's mantle was found in 2014 based on a hydrous ringwoodite sample included in a diamond from Juína, Brazil. Seismic observations suggest the presence of water in dehydration melt at the top of the lower mantle under the continental US. Molecular water (H2O) is not the primary water-bearing phase(s) in the mantle, but its high-pressure form, ice-VII, also has been found in super-deep diamonds.

See also 

 Deficit irrigation
 Magmatic water
 Origin of water on Earth
Water cycle
 Water resource

References 

Disturbution on Earth
Earth